Kim Gi-chun (born 8 September 1966) is a South Korean water polo player. He competed in the men's tournament at the 1988 Summer Olympics.

References

1966 births
Living people
South Korean male water polo players
Olympic water polo players of South Korea
Water polo players at the 1988 Summer Olympics
Place of birth missing (living people)
Asian Games medalists in water polo
Water polo players at the 1986 Asian Games
Medalists at the 1986 Asian Games
Asian Games silver medalists for South Korea